The corpus hemorrhagicum ("bleeding corpus luteum") is a temporary structure formed immediately after ovulation from the ovarian follicle as it collapses and is filled with blood that quickly clots. After the trauma heals, the subsequent structure is called the corpus luteum (which in turn becomes the corpus albicans before degenerating). Sometimes during ovulation, small blood vessels rupture, and the cavity of the ruptured follicle fills with a blood clot, a corpus hemorrhagicum.

References

External links
 Image at okstate.edu
 Image at vt.edu

Mammal female reproductive system